The Alvord chub (Siphateles alvordensis) is a rare cyprinid fish endemic to the Alvord basin in southeastern Oregon and northwestern Nevada, U.S., known only from a few springs, streams and marshes in the Sheldon National Wildlife Refuge, and one location elsewhere.

It is generally grayish-whitish, darker on the back than below, and with a faint band passing down the sides. The dorsal fin has 7 rays, the anal fin 8 rays, and the tail 19 rays. It is similar in many ways to the Borax Lake chub.

Studies of the fish's diet shows it is an opportunistic feeder, consuming a variety of aquatic invertebrates, with a considerable percentage of midge larvae.

Spawning season lasts from April to July.

Although apparently doing well in its location, the species is considered vulnerable because of its very limited range in a fragile environment. Having evolved without any competition, there is concern over the possible effects of exotic fish introduction, whether deliberate or accidental.

References

 William F. Sigler and John W. Sigler, Fishes of the Great Basin (Reno: University of Nevada Press, 1987), pp. 161–162

Siphateles
Chubs (fish)
Chub, Alvord
Fish described in 1972